Pognano is a comune (municipality) in the Province of Bergamo in the Italian region of Lombardy, located about  northeast of Milan and about  south of Bergamo.

Pognano borders the following municipalities: Arcene, Lurano, Spirano, Verdello.

Demographic evolution

References